George Hearn is an actor and singer.

George Hearn may also refer to:

George Hearn (bishop) (born 1935), Anglican bishop of Rockhampton
George M. Hearn (born 1951), is an American attorney and former member of the South Carolina House of Representatives.

See also
George Hearne (disambiguation)